is a Japanese manga series written and illustrated by Eri Sakai. It is set in a world where males are able to become pregnant; the story follows Kentaro Hiyama, an elite ad salaryman who discovers he is pregnant. Kentaro Hiyama's First Pregnancy was serialized in Kodansha's bimonthly (at the time) Be Love Magazine from August 2012 to November 2012 and has been collected into 1 tankōbon volume.

The sequel  was serialized in Kodansha's monthly Be Love Magazine from August 2019 to September 2020 and has been collected into 2 tankōbon volumes.

A third installment one-shot, titled , was released on January 5, 2023. Sakai hinted that this would be the final installment, though she has expressed interest in writing another one in the future.

While the manga has yet to receive an official English translation, it has already garnered a following in the west due to its mature handling of the themes and the commentary presented for an otherwise unusual subject.

A live-action drama series loosely based on the manga was co-produced by Netflix and TV Tokyo, with Takumi Saitoh portraying Kentaro Hiyama. The first season of the Netflix Original Series began streaming on April 21, 2022.

Synopsis

Setting
Ten years before the start of the series, men around the world started becoming pregnant in an almost serendipitous, or in some cases inconvenient way, though not as often with women; there is a one out of ten chance of it happening. The only way for men to give birth is via C-section. While it is possible for men to get an abortion, it is considered  far more dangerous for men to do it as opposed to women. The subject of pregnant men is controversial with some people treating pregnant men in an almost indifferent or prejudiced way.

Plot

Kentaro Hiyama's First Pregnancy 
Kentaro Hiyama is a 32-year-old elite salaryman who discovers that he is pregnant. Embarrassed by his unexpected problem, he is unsure whether he should keep the baby or not. He begins to take notice of the prejudice towards pregnant women and starts developing symptoms that lead to him calling his mother and asking how she felt about raising him on her own after his father died. After an encounter with a woman on a women-only passenger car, who quickly deduces his pregnancy and shows compassion by offering him to sit with them, he is further pushed to potentially keep the child. His coworker Yuichi Sato outs his pregnancy to a younger female employee who reveals her ignorant views on male pregnancy; believing he became pregnant from another man. Kentaro attempts to correct her and realizes that he must change people's perspective about male pregnancy while also deciding to keep the baby.

The rest of the manga deals with other characters close to Kentaro who are all going through similar situations of their own.

Mizuki Kawabata, the woman on the train, is also pregnant, but is in a relationship with an unfaithful boyfriend who claims that he is breaking up with his other girlfriend to be with her. However, it quickly becomes apparent that he wants her to get an abortion and marry his current girlfriend instead. When she learns that Kentaro is single and having his baby regardless, she dumps her boyfriend and announces to her coworkers her pregnancy.

Tsubasa Utsumi is a teenager who had sex and became pregnant with his girlfriend Satome's baby. His parents forced him to get an abortion and while successful has caused a rift between him and his girlfriend. Tsubasa's friends still mock pregnant men until they encounter Kentaro who gives them a stern talking to. Tsubasa learns that Satome's parents want them to break up, but after learning that Kentaro is building a restaurant that caters to pregnant and nursing people, he is encouraged to make amends with Satome and they resume their relationship.

30-year-old freelance journalist Aki Seto vehemently tells her friends that she does not want to settle and have kids. She ends up sleeping with Kentaro where they continue to see one another until they drift apart. Kentaro shows back up at her place to announce his pregnancy, which shocks her, though surprisingly she is baffled that he does not want anything from her. Aki learns that one of her friends became pregnant and is happy and she slowly begins to warm up to the idea of being a mother. Aki tells Kentaro that she can pretend to be married to him in case the paparazzi want to sensationalize his story.

Noriko Miyaji's husband is pregnant with their second child. She is envious because she was pregnant with their son Takuya and wanted to have their next baby. She is also upset that he disregards the hard work she is doing and the job she is having while he sits around the house and openly voices her displeasure of pregnant men while also hiding her husband's condition from everyone. Noriko begins to idolize her boss and his wife who have a close relationship. One day, Mr. Miyaji finds Kentaro's new restaurant "Papa & Kids" and begins to enjoy eating there. Noriko is upset upon seeing him and argues with him when he returns home. While out with Takuya, Noriko meets with her boss and his wife and discovers that they are unable to have children of their own. Takuya lets slip that his father is pregnant and the boss' wife admits that she is jealous. Noriko realizes that her husband is scared of giving birth and they make up before going to Papa & Kids as a family.

Kentaro eventually goes into labor, though oddly enough he is not shown in pain, and meets with Aki at the hospital. He successfully gives birth to a baby boy and names him Kotaro. Kentaro begins taking Kotaro to work where Aki dotes over him and he reunites with Mizuki who has also given birth and started a baby carriage business with a friend. Despite having had the baby, Kentaro still suspects that there is some prejudice and realizes that he has more to do. In the future, Kotaro is pregnant with his wife's baby and Kentaro and Aki visit where they happily congratulate them.

In a bonus chapter, Aki has decided to write a book about male pregnancy and interviews the leads from the previous chapters. During this time, she had not come out publicly about being the mother of Kotaro. In the end, she realizes that Kentaro cannot raise him on his own and tells him that she will always be there for him.

Kentaro Hiyama's First Pregnancy: Childcare Edition 
The series picks up three years after Kotaro's birth and focuses on Kentaro and Aki trying to raise Kotaro despite their conflicting work schedules. They begin to consider the possibility of living together and having another child. Meanwhile, pop sensation Seiya Aoyagi has become pregnant with fellow pop singer Asakawa Sakura's baby and decides to raise it, causing a rift between them. Kentaro's boss, Hiromi Shimomura becomes pregnant with his mistress' baby. He is in denial, but must come to terms with the growing evidence of his adultery.

Kentaro Hiyama's First Pregnancy: Separate Volume 
Taking place four years after Childcare Edition, Kentaro and Aki befriend an up and coming politician named Shimadzu Hajime who is revealed to be heavily prejudiced against pregnant men. When he finds out he is pregnant, Hajime learns a lesson from his wife, Kentaro and Aki about becoming more open-minded.

Characters

A 32-year-old single elite salaryman who becomes pregnant from his frequent tryst with Aki Seto. He was initially unsure if he wanted to keep the baby, but embraces fatherhood after experiencing workplace prejudice first hand. He constructs a restaurant called "Papa & Kids" for those who are nursing or expecting. Kentaro has a sense of entitlement and pride following his insemination as his father died prior to his own birth and his mother struggled to raise him on her own. He had no interest in co-parenting the baby with Aki until she openly suggested taking care of him while he was at work. He gives birth to a boy, whom he names Kotaro, and happily raises him. In the initial series, Kentaro and Aki keep their relationship platonic while raising Kotaro, but in Childcare Edition, they end up becoming closer and choose to move in with each other.

A 30-year-old freelance journalist and the mother of Kentaro Hiyama's baby. She was staunchly against settling down and having kids until Kentaro revealed his pregnancy to her. While initially unsure if she was actually the mother (he admitted to having other relationships) Aki develops maternal longing for a child and offers to co-parent the baby while he is at work. In the initial series, Aki maintains a platonic relationship with Kentaro while raising their son Kotaro, but in Childcare Edition this is retconned with the two of them developing genuine feelings for each other.

Kentaro and Aki's son who becomes the center of their world. He is born at the end of the initial series and in the future marries a woman named Aoi and becomes pregnant with their baby. In Childcare Edition, which takes place three years after, Kotaro becomes something of the source of conflict for Kentaro and Aki as they try to make their lives easier for him and themselves.

An office worker who becomes pregnant from her duplicitous boyfriend. She struggles with the idea of having someone to rely on with a baby on the way. Upon learning that Kentaro is pregnant and single, she is inspired to raise her baby on her own. She eventually gives birth and starts a baby carriage rental business with a friend. It is implied that she is the mother of Aoi, Kotaro's future wife. She is completely absent in Childcare Edition.

A popular idol of mixed Eurasian descent who is part of a boyband called Girl Meets Boy. He becomes pregnant from his relationship with fellow idol Asakawa Sakura. Inspired by Kentaro's story, he decides to keep his baby and hires him to act as an advisor of sorts to help handle paparazzi.

A famous singer who acquired the lead of the girl group OTW49. She is the mother of Seiya Aoyagi's baby and is initially dismissive of the news in the hopes of raising her stardom. She slowly begins to embrace the idea of being a mother.

A young politician who is prejudiced against pregnant men, only to become pregnant himself.

References

Josei manga
Kodansha manga
Manga adapted into television series
Works about human pregnancy

External Links

 at Be Love